This is a list of properties and districts in Baker County, Georgia that are listed on the National Register of Historic Places (NRHP).

Current listings

|}

References

Baker
Baker County, Georgia
National Register of Historic Places in Baker County, Georgia